Ramsey Township is a township in Kossuth County, Iowa, United States.

History
Ramsey Township was created in 1879. It was named for Wayne Ramsey, a banker and local landowner.

References

Townships in Kossuth County, Iowa
Townships in Iowa
1879 establishments in Iowa
Populated places established in 1879